Global Movie is a magazine, published monthly in India. It is owned by Seema Pimpley. It is primarily a Bollywood magazine and features articles on Bollywood films, actors, stars and reviews. It also features articles on celebrities, tourism and fashion. The magazine was earlier known as Movie.

In 2009,  Aishwarya Rai Bachchan did the cover shoot and the magazine was re-christened as Global Movie. In June 2010, Priyanka Chopra did the cover shoot. Deepika Padukone also shot for the magazine cover.

References

External links
 Global Movie Magazine Website

English-language magazines published in India
Film magazines published in India
Monthly magazines published in India
Magazines with year of establishment missing